John S. Leonardo is a former United States Attorney for the District of Arizona.

Early life and education
Born in Des Moines, Iowa, Leonardo graduated from Dowling High School in 1965. He received a BA degree  from the University of Notre Dame in 1969 and a JD from the George Washington University Law School in 1972.

Career
After law school, Leonardo became an assistant U.S. attorney for the Northern District of Indiana from 1973 to 1982 and later for the District of Arizona from 1982 to 1993 before resigning to become a Pima County Superior Court judge. He served on the Superior Court from 1993 until his retirement in February 2012. He was appointed by President Obama as United States Attorney for the District of Arizona in July 2012. He resigned this position in January 2017. In October 2017 he was appointed as an International Observer to the E.U. sponsored justice reform initiative in Tirana, Albania, with the diplomatic status of Attache to the U.S. Ambassador. He held this position until December 2019.

References

Living people
University of Notre Dame alumni
George Washington University Law School alumni
United States Attorneys for the District of Arizona
Arizona state court judges
Year of birth missing (living people)